Billie Gene Kanell (June 26, 1931 – September 7, 1951) was a United States Army soldier in the Korean War who posthumously received the U.S. military's highest decoration, the Medal of Honor. He was awarded the medal for twice falling on a grenade to protect his fellow soldiers during a 1951 battle.

Biography 
Born on June 26, 1931, in Poplar Bluff, Missouri, Kanell later joined the Army from that city. By September 7, 1951, he was serving in Korea as a private in Company I of the 35th Infantry Regiment, 25th Infantry Division. On that day, near Pyonggang, his unit was attacked by a numerically superior force. When a grenade was thrown into his emplacement, he smothered the blast with his body to protect two nearby soldiers. Although severely wounded in the explosion, he used his body to shield his comrades from another grenade which was thrown seconds later. Mortally wounded in this act, Kanell was posthumously awarded the Medal of Honor nine months later, on June 13, 1952.

Aged 20 at his death, Kanell was buried at Fairdealing Cemetery in Fairdealing, Missouri.

Medal of Honor citation
Kanell's official citation reads:
Pvt. Kanell, a member of Company I, distinguished himself by conspicuous gallantry and outstanding courage above and beyond the call of duty in action against the enemy. A numerically superior hostile force had launched a fanatical assault against friendly positions, supported by mortar and artillery fire, when Pvt. Kanell stood in his emplacement exposed to enemy observation and action and delivered accurate fire into the ranks of the assailants. An enemy grenade was hurled into his emplacement and Pvt. Kanell threw himself upon the grenade, absorbing the blast with his body to protect 2 of his comrades from serious injury and possible death. A few seconds later another grenade was thrown into the emplacement and, although seriously wounded by the first missile, he summoned his waning strength to roll toward the second grenade and used his body as a shield to again protect his comrades. He was mortally wounded as a result of his heroic actions. His indomitable courage, sustained fortitude against overwhelming odds, and gallant self-sacrifice reflect the highest credit upon himself, the infantry, and the U.S. Army.

See also

List of Korean War Medal of Honor recipients

References

External links 
 

1931 births
1951 deaths
People from Poplar Bluff, Missouri
United States Army soldiers
American military personnel killed in the Korean War
United States Army Medal of Honor recipients
Korean War recipients of the Medal of Honor
Deaths by hand grenade
United States Army personnel of the Korean War